Byomkesh O Agniban (2017) is a Bengali Detective thriller film directed by Anjan Dutt and produced by Kaustav Roy & Ashok Dhanuka. The movie features Jisshu Sengupta as the sleuth Byomkesh Bakshi. This is based on compilation of the stories Agniban and Upasanghar written by Sharadindu Bandyopadhyay. This is the sixth installment of Byomkesh series by Anjan Dutt, serving as a sequel to Byomkesh O Chiriyakhana.

Plot
The movie merged two stories of Sharadundu Bandopadhyay named Agnibaan and Uposonghar. The film starts with the hint of another story Satyanweshi where young Byomkesh caught the head of a cocaine racket who is now seeking revenge. On the other hand, a young girl dies in mysterious condition having a match stick in her hand. One Kokonad Gupta, who claims to be a fan of Byomkesh gifts him a matchbox.

Cast
 Jisshu Sengupta as Byomkesh
 Saswata Chatterjee as Ajit
 Swastika Mukherjee as Malati
 Ushasie Chakraborty as Satyabati
 Anjan Dutt as Kokonad Gupta/Doctor Anukul
 Sumatra Mukherjee as Debkumar
 Debduth Ghosh as Dr. Rudra
 Soumendra Bhattacharya
 Aritra Sengupta

References

External links
 

2017 films
Bengali-language Indian films
2010s Bengali-language films
Indian crime thriller films
Indian detective films
Films based on Indian novels
Byomkesh Bakshi films
2017 crime thriller films
Films based on works by Saradindu Bandopadhyay